General Whitfield may refer to:

Henry Wase Whitfield (1814–1877), British Army lieutenant general
John Wilkins Whitfield (1818–1879), Confederate States Army brigadier general
John Yeldham Whitfield (1899–1971), British Army major general